In folk belief, spirit is the vital principle or animating essence within all  living things. As recently as 1628 and 1633 respectively, both William Harvey and René Descartes still speculated that somewhere within the body, in a special locality, there was a "vital spirit" or "vital force", which animated the whole bodily frame, just as the engine in a factory moves the machinery in it.

Overview
People have frequently conceived of spirit as a supernatural being, or non-physical entity; for example, a demon, ghost, fairy, or angel. In ancient Islamic terminology however, the term spirit (rūḥ), applies only to "pure" spirits, but not to other invisible creatures, such as jinn, demons and  angels.

Historically, spirit has been used to refer to a "subtle" as opposed to "gross" material substance, as put forth in the notable last paragraph of Sir Isaac Newton's Principia Mathematica. In  English Bibles, "the Spirit" (with a capital "S"), specifically denotes the Holy Spirit.

The concepts of spirit and soul often overlap,
and some systems propose that both survive bodily death.
"Spirit" can have the sense of "ghost", i.e. a manifestation of the spirit of a deceased person. "Spirit" is also often used to refer to the consciousness or personality.

Etymology 
The word spirit came into Middle English via Old French esperit. Its source is Latin spīritus, whose original meaning was "breath, breathing" and hence "spirit, soul, courage, vigor"; its ultimate origin is a Proto-Indo-European root .

In Latin,  was distinct from Latin anima, whose etymological meaning was also "breathing" (PIE root *h₂enh₁-), yet which had taken a slightly different meaning, namely "soul".

Classical Greek also had a similar distinction between "soul" and "spirit", in each case involving again an etymological sense "breathing":
  (ψυχή), originally "cold air", hence "breath of life" and "soul" (PIE root  "to breathe").
  (πνεῦμα) "breath, motile air, spirit", from verb  (πνέω) "to breathe".

A distinction between soul and spirit also developed in the Abrahamic religions: Arabic  (نفس) opposite  (روح); Hebrew neshama or nephesh (in Hebrew  comes from the root  or "breath") opposite .

Usage 
"Spirit" has acquired a number of meanings:
 Christian theology can use the term "Spirit" to refer to the Holy Spirit.
 Christian Science uses "Spirit" as one of seven synonyms for God, as in: "Principle; Mind; Soul; Spirit; Life; Truth; Love"
 Latter Day Saint prophet Joseph Smith Jr. (1805-1844) rejected the concept of spirit as incorporeal or without substance: "There is no such thing as immaterial matter. All spirit is matter, but it is more fine or pure, and can only be discerned by purer eyes." Regarding the soul, Joseph Smith wrote "And the Gods formed man from the dust of the ground, and took his spirit (that is, the man’s spirit), and put it into him; and breathed into his nostrils the breath of life, and man became a living soul." Thus, the soul is the combination of a spirit with a body (although most members of the Church use "soul" and "spirit" interchangeably). In Latter-Day Saint scripture, spirits are sometimes referred to as "intelligences". However, other LDS scriptures teach that God organized the spirits out of a pre-existing substance called "intelligence" or "the light of truth". While this may seem confusing, compare how a programmer writes an algorithm by organizing lines of logical code. The logic always existed, independent of the programmer, but it is the creator who organizes it into a living spirit / intelligence / soul.
 Various forms of animism, such as Japan's Shinto and African traditional religion, focus on invisible beings that represent or connect with plants, animals, or landforms (in Japanese: kami): translators usually employ the English word "spirit" when trying to express the idea of such entities. Compare the concepts of ancestral spirits and of  spirit animals.
 According to C. G. Jung (in a lecture delivered to the literary Society of Augsburg, 20 October 1926, on the theme of “Nature and Spirit”):

 Psychical research, "In all the publications of the Society for Psychical Research the term 'spirit' stands for the personal stream of consciousness whatever else it may ultimately be proved to imply or require" (James H. Hyslop, 1919).
 Paranormal spirits: usually a nickname for a ghost or other undead spirit.

Related concepts

Similar concepts in other languages include Greek pneuma, Chinese Ling and hun (靈魂) and Sanskrit akasha / atman (see also prana). Some languages use a word for spirit often closely related (if not synonymous) to mind. Examples include the German Geist (related to the English word ghost) or the French l'esprit. English versions of the Bible most commonly translate the Hebrew word ruach (רוח; wind) as "the spirit."

Alternatively, Hebrew texts commonly use the word nephesh. Kabbalists regard nephesh as one of the five parts of the Jewish soul, where nephesh (animal) refers to the physical being and its animal instincts. Similarly, Scandinavian, Baltic, and Slavic languages, as well as Chinese (气 qi), use the words for breath to express concepts similar to "the spirit".

See also 
 Brahman
 Daemon (classical mythology)
 Deva
 Dokkaebi
 Ekam
 Geisteswissenschaft
 Great Spirit or Wakan Tanka is a term for the Supreme Being.
 Philosophy of religion
 Pneumatology
 Scientific skepticism
 Shen (Chinese religion)
 Soul (seen as a synonym of spirit)
 Soul dualism
 Soul flight
 Sprite (folklore)
 Spiritualism
 Spiritism
 Spiritism
 Spirit world (Latter Day Saints)
 Spirit world (Spiritualism)

References

Further reading

External links 
 
 

Deities and spirits
Ghosts
Religious philosophical concepts
Spirituality
Vitalism
Supernatural legends